Jesuit Memorial College (abbreviated as JMC), is a private Catholic secondary school, located in Mbodo-Aluu , Port Harcourt, Rivers State, Nigeria. The co-educational school was founded in October 2013 by the North-West Africa Province of the Society of Jesus as a monument to the sixty students of Loyola Jesuit College (LJC) Abuja who died in the crash of Sosoliso Airlines Flight 1145 in 2005.

The current student population is around 600. The college has been a featured school for its efforts to respond to environmental issues.

Administration

Presidents

 Maduabuchi Muoneme Leo |Incumbent President 2022 till present

Principals

 Alex Irechukwu Incumbent Principal 2022 till present

See also

 Catholic Church in Nigeria
 Education in Nigeria
 List of Jesuit schools

References 

Schools in Port Harcourt
Jesuit secondary schools in Nigeria
Secondary schools in Rivers State
Educational institutions established in 2013
2013 establishments in Nigeria
Catholic Church in Nigeria